Karim Fouad Abdel Hamid Mahmoud  (born 1 October 1999) is an Egyptian football player who plays as a defender for Al Ahly.

Honours and achievements
Al Ahly
 CAF Super Cup: 2021 (December)
 FIFA Club World Cup: Third-Place 2021
 Egyptian Super Cup: 2021–22

References

Living people
1999 births
Egyptian footballers
Footballers at the 2020 Summer Olympics
Association football defenders
Nogoom FC players
ENPPI SC players
Egyptian Premier League players
Olympic footballers of Egypt